Nannizziopsis chlamydospora is a keratinophilic microfungus in the family Onygenaceae that causes skin infections in reptiles, producing hyaline, thin-walled, small, sessile conidia and colonies with a strong skunk-like odour. This species is distinguished by producing chlamydospores and its ability to grow at 5 °C.

References

Further reading
Schmidt-Ukaj, Silvana, et al. "Dermatomycosis in three central bearded dragons (Pogona vitticeps) associated with Nannizziopsis chlamydospora."Journal of Veterinary Diagnostic Investigation (2016): 1040638716636422.
Paré, Jean A., and Lynne Sigler. "An overview of reptile fungal pathogens in the genera Nannizziopsis, Paranannizziopsis, and Ophidiomyces." Journal of Herpetological Medicine and Surgery (2016).

External links

Onygenales
Fungi described in 2013